Drummullan ( meaning "ridge of the bare hill") is a small village and townland in County Londonderry, Northern Ireland. Most of the village lies on the Moneymore to Stewartstown road, and is in the Mid-Ulster District.

Sport
Drummullan is home to Derry GAA club CLG Ógra Colmcille.

Notable people
Drummullan's most famous son is the "Irish Giant" Charles Byrne, who was born in Littlebridge in 1761. His 7'7" frame made him a celebrity in England, and his skeleton was put on display at London's Royal College of Surgeons after his death.

References

Villages in County Londonderry
Mid-Ulster District